Harry Richard Ragg (6 January 1889 - 15 August 1967) was the Anglican Bishop of Calagary in the mid 20th century.

Ragg was born and educated at Hereford Cathedral School and St John's College, Cambridge, where he ran in the 100 meters race against Oxford for three years in succession. He was ordained in 1912. His first ministry position was as a curate at St Paul's Southport. Emigrating to Canada, he held incumbencies at Fruitvale, Trail and Chilliwack. From 1925 to 1930 he was the rector of All Saints' Winnipeg and then the Dean of Calgary until his ordination to the episcopate in 1943.

Ragg's son, Theodore David Butler Ragg, was the Bishop of Huron from 1974 to 1984.

References

1889 births
People educated at Hereford Cathedral School
Alumni of St John's College, Cambridge
Anglican Church of Canada deans
20th-century Anglican Church of Canada bishops
Anglican bishops of Calgary
1967 deaths